Mandarin Training Center  (MTC) is one of the world's oldest and most distinguished programs for Chinese as a second language study. It is run by National Taiwan Normal University (NTNU) in Taipei, Taiwan and located at NTNU Daan Campus.

History
MTC was founded in 1956. It was briefly known as the Center for Chinese Language and Culture Studies from 2002 to 2004. The center attracts students from all parts of the world to Taiwan to study the Mandarin language and literature. Students also have access to courses in Chinese calligraphy, Chinese martial arts, and traditional music and theater. Courses are offered in three-month quarterly terms throughout the year. This system enables international students to engage in intensive language study during their summer breaks and within single semesters. The MTC sponsors travel, hosts speech contests, and stages workshops and performances.

In September 2016, NTNU and the Ministry of Education launched the Office of Global Mandarin Education at the university.

Enrollment
Over a thousand students from over seventy countries enroll for studies each year at the Mandarin Training Center. Nations represented include Australia, South Korea, Japan, Malaysia, Vietnam, Thailand, Indonesia, Germany, Spain, France, the United Kingdom, Kenya, South Africa, the United States, Canada, and countries in the Middle East and in Central, and South America and the Caribbean. This international presence makes the Shida neighborhood of Taipei one of the city's most cosmopolitan. Since 8 April 2013, people unable to attend MTC have had MTC Online on the Internet as an option. The center's alumni association, the MTCAA, has been in existence since 1998.

Notable alumni
Ákos Bertalan Apatóczky - Hungarian sinologist
Richard Bernstein - American journalist
March Fong Eu - American politician
Andrew Fastow - former CFO of Enron
Howard Goldblatt - American literary translator
Imre Hamar - Hungarian scholar of Chinese studies
Ryutaro Hashimoto - former Prime Minister of Japan
Jon Huntsman, Jr. - former United States Ambassador to Singapore from 1992 to 1993, and China from 2009 to 2011
Koichi Kato - former government minister of Japan
Pierre Ryckmans - Belgian-Australian writer, essayist and sinologist
Kevin Rudd - former Prime Minister of Australia
Chie Tanaka - Japanese model and actress
Richard Vuylsteke - President of the American Chamber of Commerce in Hong Kong
Stephen H. West - American sinologist
Pierre Marsone - French sinologist

See also
International Chinese Language Program (ICLP) at the National Taiwan University
Chinese Language Center (CLC) of National Dong Hwa University (NDHU)
Mandarin Learning Center (MLC) at Chinese Culture University
List of Chinese language schools in Taiwan
Chinese as a second language
Huayu Enrichment Scholarship

References

External links
Mandarin Training Center 
Mandarin Training Center Alumni Association 
Mandarin Training Center Online  
National Taiwan Normal University

1956 establishments in Taiwan
Educational institutions established in 1956
Academic language institutions
Language schools in Taiwan
Schools of Chinese as a second or foreign language
National Taiwan Normal University